The short-tail nurse shark (Pseudoginglymostoma brevicaudatum) is a nurse shark in the family Ginglymostomatidae, the only member of the genus Pseudoginglymostoma.  It is found in the tropical western Indian Ocean between latitudes 0° and 27° S, and reaches a length of 75 cm.

Distribution
In 2020, a short-tail nurse shark was caught on footage in South Africa by Forrest Galante as he searched for the whitetip weasel shark.

See also

 List of sharks

References

 
 http://www.artis.nl/main.php?pagina=paginas/a/persberichten - Dutch press statement about the birth of 4 short-tail nurse sharks

Ginglymostomatidae
Ovoviviparous fish
Fish described in 1867
Taxa named by Albert Günther